Regő Szánthó (born 22 November 2000) is a Hungarian professional footballer who plays as a midfielder for Fortuna Liga club DAC Dunajská Streda on loan from Ferencváros.

Club career

Ferencváros
On 16 June 2020, he became champion with Ferencváros by beating Honvéd Budapest at the Hidegkuti Nándor Stadion on the 30th match day of the 2019–20 Nemzeti Bajnokság I season.

Career statistics
.

References

External links
 
 

2000 births
Sportspeople from Győr
Living people
Hungarian footballers
Hungary youth international footballers
Hungary under-21 international footballers
Association football midfielders
Győri ETO FC players
Ferencvárosi TC footballers
Soroksár SC players
Zalaegerszegi TE players
FC DAC 1904 Dunajská Streda players
Nemzeti Bajnokság I players
Nemzeti Bajnokság II players
Slovak Super Liga players
Hungarian expatriate footballers
Expatriate footballers in Slovakia
Hungarian expatriate sportspeople in Slovakia